Events of 2020 in Yemen.

Incumbents
President: Abdrabbuh Mansur Hadi 
Vice President of Yemen: Yemeni Army general Ali Mohsen al-Ahmar
Prime Minister: Maeen Abdulmalik Saeed

Events

January

January 1
Yemeni rebels release some Saudi prisoners, as UN-led peace talks make progress.
January 7
Houthi rebels shot down a drone belonging to the Saudi-led coalition, in the northeastern province of Jawf.
January 8
Saudi Arabia begins efforts to rebuild power stations in Yemen.
January 18
2020 Ma'rib attack - A missile attack on a military camp near Ma'rib kills 111 Yemeni soldiers. No group claimed responsibility.
 January 29 - Qasim al-Raymi, Emir of al-Qaeda in the Arabian Peninsula (b. 1978).
 31 January
Houthi armed forces spokesman Gen. Yahya Sarea announced that Houthi forces managed to liberate roughly 2,500 km2 of territory including the city of Naham, and parts of the governorates of Al-Jawf and Marib, from Saudi-led forces. The coalition forces immediately denied this claim, claiming victory and progress in these areas.“In the Nahm district, east of the capital Sanaa, the National Army managed to regain control of a number of Houthi-controlled areas,” Majli said.

February
 15 February
a Saudi fighter jet crashed in Yemen and the Houthi rebels claimed responsibility for the attack. The next day, the Saudi-led coalition launched airstrikes, targeting Yemen's northern Al-Jawf province and killed 31 civilians.

March
1 March
Houthi forces captured the city of Al Hazm, the capital of Al-Jawf province during the 2020 al-Jawf offensive.
30 March
the Saudi-led coalition carried out an airstrike on the Yemeni capital, Sanaa. The attacks came despite the UN Secretary-General António Guterres and other organizations asking to maintain ceasefire amidst the COVID-19 pandemic. In their statement, a group of regional experts also said that all political prisoners should be released from prisons to tackle with the appalling health care system, and stop the COVID-19 pandemic from spreading in Yemen.

April
5 April
at least 5 women were killed and 28 people injured when shelling hit the woman's section of Taiz's main prison. The shelling came from the part of the divided city controlled by the Houthis.
10 April
The first case of COVID-19 in Yemen arrived to a patient living in Ash Shihr in Hadhramaut.
26 April
The Southern Transitional Council declared autonomous rule.

May 
 26 May
 Houthi fighters attacked a military base in Ma'rib Governorate, killing seven people.
 28 May
 United Nations agencies and other international humanitarian partners launch a US$2.41 billion appeal for addition funds to fight the spread of COVID-19 in Yemen.

June 
 21 June
 The Southern Transitional Council seized control of the island of Socotra.

July 
 15 July
 The United Nations warned that the FSO Safer could spill four times as much oil as the Exxon Valdez oil spill.

August 
 A series of flash floods killed 172 people across Yemen and damaged UNESCO world heritage sites throughout the country.

December 

 4 December
 At least 8 people were killed in an attack on an industrial compound in Al Hudaydah.
 30 December
 At least 20 were killed in the attack in Aden Airport after the new government arrived.

Deaths 

 29 January – Qasim al-Raymi, Emir of al-Qaeda in the Arabian Peninsula (b. 1978).
 2 October – Shaher Abdulhak, Yemeni billionaire businessman (b. 1938).

See also

 Yemen
 Economy of Yemen
 History of Yemen
 Outline of Yemen

Yemen government
 Politics of Yemen

Executive branch
President of Yemen
 Prime Minister of Yemen
Imams of Yemen
List of heads of state of Yemen
 List of heads of government of Yemen

Legislative
 House of Representatives (Yemen)
 List of speakers of the House of Representatives of Yemen
 List of legislatures by country

Political groups
 Southern Transitional Council

Yemen conflicts
 Yemen War
 Houthi insurgency in Yemen (2004–2015)
 South Yemen insurgency (2009–2015)
 Yemeni Civil War (2015–present)
Saudi Arabian-led intervention in Yemen (2015–present)
Saudi–Yemeni border conflict (2015–present)

Other
 2016–2021 Yemen cholera outbreak
 COVID-19 pandemic in Yemen

References

External links
 UN official news site for Yemen
 News items on Houthis at Al Jazeera website
 BBC overview
 UK Independent

 
Yemen
Years of the 21st century in Yemen